The Konya Manuscript, MS Evkaf Muzesi 1845+ or Evkaf Muzesi 1845–1881 at , is an autograph manuscript of Ibn Arabi's magnum opus Al-Futuhat al-Makkiyya (The Meccan Revelations), completed in 37 volumes in 1238.

History 
Ibn Arabi wrote al-Futuhat al-Makkiyya twice—a first draft completed in 1231 and a revision—the Konya manuscript— completed in 1238.

Standard Cairo edition 
The Amiri Press in Bulaq published three editions of al-Futuhat al-Makkiyya, in 1269–1274, in 1876, and in 1911. While the first two editions were composite texts from Ibn Arab's first draft and revision, the third edition reproduced the text of the Konya Manuscript, thanks to the investigative efforts of Emir ʿAbd al-Qādir al-Jazāʾirī. This third edition became the standard Cairo edition.

Description 
The manuscript is a holograph; it was written in the hand of Ibn Arabi, with the exception of volume 9.

The work contains 28 images hand-drawn by Ibn Arabi: geometric figures representing and illustrating the physical and the metaphysical. Reproductions of these images in published versions of the text were made carelessly and are not reliable.

References 

Ibn Arabi
Sufi literature
Islamic manuscripts
Arabic manuscripts